= Thallic =

Thallic can refer to:

- Macrothallic, meaning large bodied - usually referring to Seaweed
- Thallus, an undifferentiated vegetative tissue of plants and fungi
- Thallic compound, a compound which contains thallium in the +3 oxidation state
